Addyman may refer to:

 Brian Addyman, a fictional character in the British ITV soap opera Emmerdale
 Caroline Addyman, a fictional character in the British ITV soap opera Emmerdale
 Katie Sugden (AKA Addyman), a fictional character in the British ITV soap opera Emmerdale
 Peter Addyman (born 1939), British archaeologist
 Addyman STG, a British single-seat glider which first flew in 1934, designed by Erik T. W. Addyman
 Addyman Zephyr, a British single-seat sailplane which first flew in 1933, designed by Erik T. W. Addyman

See also